Kinepolis Brussels is a cinema complex on the Heysel in Brussels, Belgium, owned by the Kinepolis Group.

History
In November 1988, Kinepolis Brussels, was opened by Kinepolis, as the first branch of the European chain, with 25 screens and 7,600 seats, credited as being the first both the first and the then-largest cinema Megaplex in the world.

‌The IMAX in the Brussels Kinepolis complex was open from 1988 until the end of 2005. The hall was closed due to a shortage of available content. On November 16, 2016, Kinepolis announced the reopening of the hall. It is equipped with laser projection and IMAX's new 12.1 sound technology. At the time, the screen was the largest IMAX screen in Europe with a surface area of 532m².

See also 
 List of IMAX venues

References

External links 

 visit.brussels (kinepolis)

Cinemas in Belgium
Buildings and structures in Brussels
Buildings and structures completed in 1988
1988 establishments in Belgium
IMAX venues